Shivdaspur is a village situated in the Rampur Maniharan Mandal of Saharanpur District in Uttar Pradesh, India.

References 

Villages in Saharanpur district